Boris Ivanov (born 29 September 1947) is a Soviet athlete. He competed in the men's decathlon at the 1972 Summer Olympics.

References

1947 births
Living people
Athletes (track and field) at the 1972 Summer Olympics
Soviet decathletes
Olympic athletes of the Soviet Union
People from Ivanovo